Pluteus salicinus is a European psychedelic mushroom that grows on wood. It is an edible mushroom after parboiling.

Taxonomy
The species was originally described by Christian Hendrik Persoon as Agaricus salicinus in 1798. Paul Kummer transferred it to the genus Pluteus in 1871.

Description
Cap: 2 — 5(8) cm in diameter, convex becoming broadly convex to plane, silver-gray to brownish-gray, often with blue or greenish tint in age, smooth, with tiny scales near the center, darker at the margin, slightly translucent-striate when moist, unlined cap margin, flesh white with a grayish tinge, thin to moderate. Cap skin fibrous.
Gills: Crowded, broad, free, at first white, becoming pink-flesh colored; ventricose. Edges discoloring or bruising grayish.
Stipe: 3 — 5(10) long, 0.2 — 0.6 cm thick, more or less equal or slightly swollen at the base, flesh white with grayish-green to bluish-green tones, especially near the base. Ring absent. Firm, full or stuffed.
Taste: Unpleasant, indefinite or somewhat raphanoid (like radish).
Odor: Unpleasant, indefinite or somewhat raphanoid.
Spores: pink, smooth, 7 — 8.5 x 5 - 6 µm. Spore print pink-flesh colored to brown-pink.
Microscopic features: Pleurocystidia fusiform with slightly thickened walls 50 — 70 x 11 — 18 µm; with 3 — 5 horn-like projections.

Habitat and distribution
This mushroom is widely distributed across western Europe and Siberia. It is found on hardwoods - Alnus, Eucalyptus, Fagus, Populus and Quercus.

It is always found growing on wood. Summer-fall, solitary or gregarious on dead wood of hardwoods, in damp forests on flood-plains.

Common name
The 'knackers crumpet' is a localised, common name referring to Pluteus salicinus. Its use is most prominent in the North of England.

Chemistry
The concentration of psilocybin and psilocin in the dried sample of P. salicinus has been reported in the range of 0.21-0.35 and 0.011-0.05%, respectively.

See also
List of Pluteus species
List of Psilocybin mushrooms

References

External links
 Pluteus salicinus photo and description

salicinus
Psychoactive fungi
Edible fungi
Psychedelic tryptamine carriers
Fungi described in 1798
Fungi of Europe
Fungi of North America
Taxa named by Christiaan Hendrik Persoon